is a Japanese professional golfer.

Takahashi plays on the Japan Golf Tour, and has won twice.

Professional wins (4)

Japan Golf Tour wins (2)

Japan Challenge Tour wins (1)

Other wins (1)
2005 Hitachi 3Tours Championship (with Keiichiro Fukabori, Yasuharu Imano, Toru Taniguchi, and Shinichi Yokota)

Results in World Golf Championships

External links

Japanese male golfers
Japan Golf Tour golfers
Sportspeople from Fukuoka Prefecture
1974 births
Living people